Flor Joosen (born Turnhout, 30 June 1952) is a Belgian businessman, who became well known for his caviar business. Since 1 July 2007, he is also president of UNIZO.

Education
Flor Joosen graduated in economics at the Instituut voor Hoger Niet-Universitaire Studies (IHNUS) in Ghent.

Career
Flor Joosen descends from a family of millers, and the windmill in the Bokrijk museum is an old mill of the Joosen family business.
He started his career in the family business for cattle (Joosen-Luyckx) and fish feed (Joosen-Luyckx Aqua Bio). Later on, he became active in poultry with Belki, a poultry slaughterhouse.

In the eighties, he wanted to improve on the fish feed and contacted Willy Verdonck at the Katholieke Universiteit Leuven. Out of this contact grew a fishfarm, which was the basis for a sturgeon nursery, and which led to the caviar business in the early nineties of the twentieth century.

Sources
 Kaviaarkweker Flor Joosen nieuwe voorzitter Unizo 
 Flor Joosen nieuwe Unizo-voorzitter 
 Flor Joosen benoemd tot nieuwe Unizo-voorzitter 

1952 births
Living people
Belgian businesspeople